Ricardo Garcia Cappelli (born Rio de Janeiro, 11 February 1972) is a Brazilian journalist and politician. He was appointed the Executive Secretary to the Ministry of Justice and Public Security on 1 January 2023, and additionally the Federal Intervenor in the Secretariat for Public Security of the Federal District on 8 January 2023.

Career 
Cappelli was born in Rio de Janeiro and studied data science at the University of Estácio de Sá.

Cappelli was an adviser to a Rio councillor on youth policy from 2000 to 2002, when he stood unsuccessfully on a Communist ticket for the Legislative Assembly of Rio de Janeiro.

He was National Secretary for sport, education, recreation and social inclusion in the Ministry of Sports from 2003 to 2006, Secretary of development of Nova Iguaçu in 2008, and Secretary of Communication of Maranhão during the term of Flávio Dino as Governor; he followed Dino in leaving the communists and joining the Ministry of Justice and Public Security.

On 8 January 2023, he was named Federal Intervenor to the Secretariat for Public Security of the Federal District by the newly inaugurated President, Lula da Silva, in the light of the invasion of the Praça dos Três Poderes by supporters of his predecessor, Jair Bolsonaro.

References

Brazilian politicians
Communist Party of Brazil politicians
1972 births
Living people
Politicians from Rio de Janeiro (city)